Hamal Wahab (born 9 November 1994) is a Pakistani cricketer. He made his first-class debut for Quetta in the 2012–13 Quaid-e-Azam Trophy on 25 January 2013.

References

External links
 

1994 births
Living people
Pakistani cricketers
Baluchistan cricketers
Quetta cricketers